Political Repression in Modern America from 1870 to 1976 is a historical account of significant civil liberties violations concerning American political dissidents since 1870a date demarcating the close of the Civil War decade and the development of the modern American industrial state.

Reviews
Review Contemporary Sociology (and again)
Review in the Journal of Politics
Review in International Affairs
Review in Labour
Review in The Journal of American History
Review in The American Historical Review

History books about the United States
Political repression in the United States